CD Crucis, also known as HD 311884, is an eclipsing binary star system in the constellation Crux.  It is around 14,000 light years away near the faint open cluster Hogg 15. The binary contains a Wolf–Rayet star and is also known as WR 47.

System
CD Cru is composed of two massive and highly luminous stars aligned so that they eclipse each other as they orbit every 6 days and 6 hours. One is a hot blue O-type main sequence star of spectral type O5V that is 57 times as massive as the Sun, while the other is an even hotter Wolf–Rayet star of spectral type WN6 that is 48 times as massive as the Sun. The WR star dominates the spectrum but is less bright, so which star is considered the primary varies. For clarity the components are referred to as WR and O

Hogg 15

Hogg 15 is a small faint open cluster that has been calculated to lie about 4.2 kpc away.  CD Cru is considered a likely member of the cluster, in which case it would be the brightest member by over a magnitude. It lies outside the central two arc-minute condensation of the cluster, but well within the outer bounds discovered for the member stars. The cluster is calculated to be only eight million years old.

The brighter and closer cluster NGC 4609 lies 10 arc-minutes away, and both clusters are near the centre of the dark Coalsack Nebula. Both clusters are actually more distant than the Coalsack so are seen through it rather than against it. It suffers 3.5 magnitudes of interstellar extinction. Between the two clusters lies the 5th magnitude BZ Crucis, a much closer foreground object.

Properties
The WR component is five times the radius of the sun, but its high temperature means it is over 100,000 times more luminous. Its mass is determined from the orbital motion to be .

References

Crux (constellation)
Crucis, CD
311884
O-type main-sequence stars
Wolf–Rayet stars
J12435102-6305148
062115
Eclipsing binaries